C.S. (Carole Schwerdtfeger) Adler (born February 23, 1932) is an American children's book author. She has been a full-time writer since the publication of her first book, The Magic of the Glits, in 1979. That book won both the William Allen White Award and the Golden Kite Award.

Books
She has since published 43 more books for young readers. Many of her books have been on state lists and have also been published in Japan, Germany, England, Denmark, Austria, Sweden, and France.

Book awards
The Magic of the Glits won both the William Allen White Award and the Golden Kite Award.
The Shell Lady's Daughter was chosen by the A.L.A. as one of the best young adult books of 1983.
With Westie and the Tin Man won the Children's Book Award of the Child Study Committee in 1986.
Split Sisters & Ghost Brother were I.R.A. Children's Choices selections.
One Sister Too Many was on the 1991 Young Adults' Choices list.
Always and Forever Friends & Eddie's Blue Winged Dragon were on the 1991 I.R.A. 99 Favorite Paperbacks list.
One Unhappy Horse was the ASPCA Henry Berg Award in 2002.

Background and personal life
Adler moved to Tucson, Arizona, after spending most of her life in upstate New York, where before publishing she was a middle school English teacher in the Niskayuna school district, for nearly a decade.

Bibliography

References

External links 

Author's web site

 

American children's writers
1932 births
Living people
People from Niskayuna, New York
Schoolteachers from New York (state)